Guptodhoner Sondhane is a 2018 Indian Bengali action, adventure and mystery film, written and directed by Dhrubo Banerjee and produced by Shrikant Mohta and Mahendra Soni under the banner of Shree Venkatesh Films. The film was blockbuster at the box-office

Plot
Professor Subarna Sen, alias Sonada, (Abir Chatterjee) is a professor of history at Oxford University. Returning to India after several years, Sonada meets his nephew Abir (Arjun Chakraborty) and Jhinuk (Ishaa Saha), Abir's best friend. Abir takes Sonada to their ancestral home in the village of Manikantapur, where Abir’s eccentric but erudite maternal uncle Harinarayan Singha Roy (Goutam Ghose) had recently died under mysterious circumstances. During their visit, they learn of the 350-year-old Mughal treasure of emperor Shah Jahan's second son, Prince Shuja, that is hidden somewhere in that palace. Before his death, Harinarayan Singha Roy had left a clue in his diary to help Abir locate the treasure. At the same time, they discover that the local promoter and political hopeful Dashanan Da (Rajatabha Dutta) also knows about the treasure and is trying to steal it.

Cast
 Abir Chatterjee as Professor Subarna Sen aka Sonada, the protagonist
 Arjun Chakrabarty as Abir, Sonada's nephew
Ishaa Saha as Jhinuk,  Abir's friend and love interest
Rajatabha Dutta as Dashanan Da, the main antagonist
Kamaleshwar Mukherjee as Akhilesh, Jhinuk's father
Goutam Ghose as Harinarayan Singha Roy, Abir's eccentric maternal uncle (special appearance)
Arindam Sil as Abir's father (Guest Appearance)
Baisakhi Marjit as Abir's mother (Guest Appearance)

Production

Development and filming
The film was directed by Dhrubo Banerjee and written by Banerjee and Subhendu Dasmunsi.

Banerjee conceived of the film as part of a franchise with the same protagonist, and has already written the next two stories.

Shooting started at the end of December 2017, on location at Kolkata and Bolpur.

Release
The trailer launched on 27 March 2018 and the film released on 27 April 2018.

Sequel
A sequel to this movie titled Durgeshgorer Guptodhon, with the same lead cast and director, was released on 24 May 2019.

Another sequel was released on 30th September 2022 named Karnasubarner Guptodhon

Soundtrack

The soundtrack is composed by Bickram Ghosh and lyrics by Shubhendu Das Munshi. The song "Rangiye Diye Jao" originally composed by Rabindranath Tagore, was reinterpreted by Bickram Ghosh under direction of Dhrubo Banerjee.

Reception
Guptodhoner Sandhane was a box office blockbuster. Arghya Bandyopadhyay of Anandabazar Patrika gave it a rating of 6 out of 10. Firstpost rated it 3 out of 5 saying "The best thing about the film is its simplicity. The makers do not have any illusions of grandeur, they know exactly the kind of film they are making, they know their audiences in and out and they customise their offering accordingly. The film did very good business at the box-office, despite Haami was a super-hit at the box-office.

References

External links
 

Bengali-language Indian films
2010s Bengali-language films
2018 films
2010s action adventure films
Indian action adventure films
Films scored by Bickram Ghosh
Indian mystery films